
Year 198 (CXCVIII) was a common year starting on Sunday (link will display the full calendar) of the Julian calendar. At the time, it was known as the Year of the Consulship of Sergius and Gallus (or, less frequently, year 951 Ab urbe condita). The denomination 198 for this year has been used since the early medieval period, when the Anno Domini calendar era became the prevalent method in Europe for naming years.

Events 
 By place 
 Roman Empire 
January 28 
Publius Septimius Geta, son of Septimius Severus, receives the title of Caesar.
Caracalla, son of Septimius Severus, is given the title of Augustus.

 China 
Winter – Battle of Xiapi: The allied armies led by Cao Cao and Liu Bei defeat Lü Bu; afterward Cao Cao has him executed.

 By topic 
 Religion 
 Marcus I succeeds Olympianus as Patriarch of Constantinople (until 211).

Births 
 Lu Kai (or Jingfeng), Chinese official and general (d. 269)
 Quan Cong, Chinese general and advisor (d. 249)

Deaths 
 Li Jue (or Zhiran), Chinese warlord and regent
 Liu Yao, Chinese governor and warlord (b. 157)
 Mi Heng, Chinese musician and writer (b. 173)
 Zhang Yang, Chinese official and warlord

References